Nelepeč-Žernůvka is a municipality in Brno-Country District in the South Moravian Region of the Czech Republic. It has about 80 inhabitants.

Administrative parts
The municipality is made up of villages of Nelepeč and Žernůvka.

References

Villages in Brno-Country District